Count Carlo Archinto (30 July 1669 – 17 December 1732) was an Italian aristocrat and patron of the arts.

He was born into the aristocratic Archinto family and was educated initially under the Jesuits at the Brera Academy of Milan. He then studied with he Jesuits at the University of Ingolstadt. He travelled as a young man through France, Germany, Holland, and his native Italy and returned in Milan in 1700. In 1702, he founded a scholarly academy, which met at his palace. He collaborated with Filippo Argelati to publish the epic history by Muratori, titled Scriptores Rerum Italicarum. He was rewarded with appointments by the Hapsburg rulers. Archinto commissioned frescoes by the Venetian Tiepolo to decorate his family's Palazzo Archinto.

References

External links 
 

1669 births
1732 deaths
18th-century Italian writers
18th-century Italian male writers
Italian art patrons
People from Milan